This is a list of the Australian moth species of the family Noctuidae. It also acts as an index to the species articles and forms part of the full List of moths of Australia.

Acontiinae
Acontia clerana (Lower, 1902)
Acontia crocata Guenée, 1852
Acontia detrita Butler, 1886
Acontia elaeoa (Hampson, 1910)
Acontia nivipicta Butler, 1886
Acontia thapsina (Turner, 1902)
Alypophanes iridocosma Turner, 1908
Amyna apicalis (Walker, 1865)
Amyna apicipuncta (Turner, 1936)
Amyna auriculata (Turner, 1903)
Amyna axis (Guenée, 1852)
Amyna natalis (Walker, 1859)
Amyna onthodes (Lower, 1903)
Amyna punctum (Fabricius, 1794)
Araeopteron canescens (Walker, 1866)
Araeopteron epiphracta (Turner, 1902)
Araeopteron imbecilla (Turner, 1933)
Araeopteron micraeola (Meyrick, 1902)
Araeopteron microclyta (Turner, 1920)
Araeopteron pleurotypa (Turner, 1902)
Araeopteron poliobapta (Turner, 1925)
Autoba abrupta (Walker, 1865)
Autoba crassiuscula (Walker, 1864)
Autoba dispar Warren, 1913
Autoba latericolor (Turner, 1945)
Autoba loxotoma (Turner, 1909)
Autoba pectorora (T.P. Lucas, 1895)
Autoba quadrapex (Hampson, 1891)
Autoba rubra (Hampson, 1902)
Autoba silicula (Swinhoe, 1897)
Autoba sphragidota (Turner, 1902)
Autoba undilinea Warren, 1913
Autoba versicolor Walker, 1864
Carmara subcervina Walker, 1863
Cerynea trogobasis Hampson, 1910
Chaograptis crystallodes Meyrick, 1902
Chaograptis euchrysa (Lower, 1903)
Chaograptis rhaptina (Turner, 1904)
Clytoscopa iorrhoda Turner, 1931
Clytoscopa serena Turner, 1931
Coccidiphaga scitula (Rambur, 1833)
Cophanta funestalis Walker, 1864
Corgatha ancistrodes Turner, 1936
Corgatha dichionistis Turner, 1902
Corgatha dipyra Turner, 1902
Corgatha drosera (Meyrick, 1891)
Corgatha figuralis (Walker, 1866)
Corgatha miltophyres Turner, 1920
Corgatha minuta (Bethune-Baker, 1906)
Corgatha molybdophaes Turner, 1936
Corgatha ochrobapta Turner, 1941
Corgatha omopis (Meyrick, 1902)
Corgatha pleuroplaca Turner, 1936
Corgatha semipardata (Walker, 1861)
Corgatha sideropasta (Turner, 1936)
Decticryptis deleta (Moore, 1885)
Diastema tigris Guenée, 1852
Ecnomia hesychima Turner, 1936
Enispa daphoena (Hampson, 1910)
Enispa niviceps (Turner, 1909)
Enispa parva (Bethune-Baker, 1906)
Enispa phaeopa Turner, 1945
Enispa prolectus (Turner, 1908)
Enispa rhodopleura Turner, 1945
Enispa violacea (T.P. Lucas, 1894)
Epopsima fasciolata (Butler, 1886)
Eublemma anachoresis (Wallengren, 1863)
Eublemma cochylioides (Guenée, 1852)
Eublemma dimidialis (Fabricius, 1794)
Eublemma inconspicua (Walker, 1865)
Eublemma innocens (Butler, 1886)
Eublemma leucodesma (Lower, 1899)
Eublemma lozostropha Turner, 1902
Eublemma marmaropa Meyrick, 1902
Eublemma nymphodora Meyrick, 1902
Eublemma pudica (Snellen, 1880)
Eublemma ragusana (Freyer, 1845)
Eublemma rivula (Moore, 1882)
Eublemma roseana (Moore, 1881)
Eublemma rufipuncta Turner, 1902
Eublemma vestalis (Butler, 1886)
Eugatha thermochroa Hampson, 1911
Eulocastra fasciata Butler, 1886
Eulocastra tripartita (Butler, 1886)
Eustrotia papuensis Warren, 1913
Habrophyes xuthosoma (Turner, 1909)
Haplopseustis erythrias Meyrick, 1902
Heterorta plutonis (T.P. Lucas, 1895)
Himerois angustitaenia (Warren, 1913)
Himerois basiscripta (Warren, 1913)
Himerois periphaea Turner, 1920
Himerois thiochroa Turner, 1902
Himerois univittata (Pagenstecher, 1900)
Holocryptis phasianura T.P. Lucas, 1892
Hypobleta cymaea Turner, 1908
Hyposada addescens (Swinhoe, 1901)
Hyposada aspersa (Turner, 1945)
Hyposada hydrocampata (Guenée, 1857)
Hyposada postvittata (Moore, 1887)
Lacistophanes hackeri Turner, 1947
Maliattha amorpha (Butler, 1886)
Maliattha ferrugina Turner, 1908
Maliattha ritsemae (Snellen, 1880)
Maliattha signifera (Walker, 1858)
Mataeomera acrosticha (Turner, 1920)
Mataeomera anaemacta (Turner, 1920)
Mataeomera brevipalpis (Turner, 1945)
Mataeomera coccophaga (Meyrick, 1887)
Mataeomera dubia Butler, 1886
Mataeomera ligata (T.P. Lucas, 1895)
Mataeomera mesotaenia (Turner, 1929)
Mataeomera porphyris (Turner, 1920)
Mataeomera punctilinea (Turner, 1945)
Metachrostis paurograpta Butler, 1886
Metasada polycesta (Turner, 1902)
Micraeschus rufipallens Warren, 1913
Micrapatetis icela Turner, 1920
Micrapatetis leucozona (Turner, 1902)
Micrapatetis orthozona Meyrick, 1897
Microedma extorris Warren, 1913
Mimasura albiceris (Turner, 1903)
Narangodes nigridiscata (Swinhoe, 1901)
Oruza cervinipennis Warren, 1913
Oruza crocodeta (Turner, 1903)
Ozarba chrysaspis (Meyrick, 1891)
Ozarba punctigera Walker, 1865
Parerastria castaneata Warren, 1914
Peperita molybdopasta (Turner, 1908)
Pseudcraspedia puntata Hampson, 1898
Pseudephyra straminea Butler, 1886
Pseudozarba hemiplaca (Meyrick, 1902)
Pseudozarba orthopetes (Meyrick, 1897)
Pyripnoa auricularia (T.P. Lucas, 1895)
Pyripnoa pyraspis (Meyrick, 1891)
Pyripnoa sciaptera (Lower, 1903)
Sophta concavata Walker, 1863
Sophta hapalopis Turner, 1925
Sophta poecilota (Turner, 1908)
Tabomeeres dolera (Turner, 1939)
Technemon epichares Turner, 1945
Thaumasiodes eurymitra Turner, 1939
Trissernis ochrochlora (Turner, 1902)
Trissernis prasinoscia Meyrick, 1902
Vescisa digona (Hampson, 1910)
Xanthograpta glycychroa (Turner, 1904)
Xanthograpta purpurascens (Hampson, 1910)
Xenopseustis poecilastis Meyrick, 1897

The following species belongs to the subfamily Acontiinae, but have not been assigned to a genus yet. Given here is the original name given to the species when it was first described:
Micrapatetis albiviata Hampson, 1910
Eublemma amphidasys Turner, 1933
Tortrix apicana Donovan, 1805
Sarrothripa baeopis Turner, 1906
Oruza bipunctata Warren, 1913
Thermesia cariosa T.P. Lucas, 1895
Erastria clandestina Turner, 1909
Eublemma eurynipha Turner, 1902
Xenogenes eustrotiodes L.B. Prout, 1910
Eublemma glaucochroa Turner, 1902
Megalodes hedychroa Turner, 1904
Eublemma iophaenna Turner, 1920
Oruza leucostigma Turner, 1945
Oruza lithochroma Turner, 1929
Oruza megalospila Turner, 1933
Erastria miasma Hampson, 1891
Parasada molybdocolpa Turner, 1945
Eulocastra phaeozona Hampson, 1910
Eromene rosata Lower, 1894
Selenis semilux Walker, 1865
Zagira stragulata Pagenstecher, 1900
Eulocastra thermozona Hampson, 1910

Amphipyrinae
Acrapex albicostata (Lower, 1905)
Acrapex exsanguis Lower, 1902
Acronicta dinawa (Bethune-Baker, 1906)
Acronicta psorallina (Lower, 1903)
Actinotia hyperici (Denis & Schiffermüller, 1775)
Aedia arctipennis (Hulstaert, 1924)
Aedia leucomelas (Linnaeus, 1758)
Aedia olivescens (Guenée, 1852)
Aedia sericea (Butler, 1882)
Ancara plaesiosema Turner, 1943
Athetis maculatra (Lower, 1902)
Athetis reclusa (Walker, 1862)
Athetis striolata (Butler, 1886)
Athetis tenuis (Butler, 1886)
Athetis thoracica (Moore, 1884)
Aucha triphaenoides (Walker, 1865)
Aucha vesta Swinhoe, 1901
Bagada turpisoides (Poole, 1989)
Barybela chionostigma Turner, 1944
Bathytricha aethalion Turner, 1944
Bathytricha leonina (Walker, 1865)
Bathytricha monticola Turner, 1925
Bathytricha phaeosticha Turner, 1931
Bathytricha truncata (Walker, 1856)
Borbotana nivifascia Walker, 1858
Callopistria ferruginea (Hampson, 1908)
Callopistria insularis Butler, 1882
Callopistria maillardi (Guenée, 1862)
Callopistria placodoides (Guenée, 1852)
Callopistria rivularis Walker, 1858
Callyna leuconota Lower, 1903
Callyna leucosticha Turner, 1911
Callyna monoleuca Walker, 1858
Calophasidia cana (Turner, 1939)
Calophasidia dentifera Hampson, 1909
Calophasidia dichroa (Hampson, 1926)
Calophasidia latens (Turner, 1929)
Calophasidia lucala (Swinhoe, 1902)
Calophasidia radiata (Swinhoe, 1902)
Chasmina candida (Walker, 1865)
Chasmina pulchra (Walker, 1858)
Chasmina tenuilinea Hampson, 1910
Chasmina tibialis (Fabricius, 1775)
Condica aroana (Bethune-Baker, 1906)
Condica dolorosa (Walker, 1865)
Condica illecta (Walker, 1865)
Condica praesecta (Warren, 1912)
Condica sublucens (Warren, 1912)
Cosmodes elegans (Donovan, 1805)
Craniophora fasciata (Moore, 1884)
Craniophora nodyna (Turner, 1904)
Craniophora phaeocosma (Turner, 1920)
Data aroa (Bethune-Baker, 1906)
Data dissimilis Warren, 1911
Data ochroneura (Turner, 1943)
Data pratti (Bethune-Baker, 1906)
Data thalpophiloides Walker, 1862
Diplonephra ditata (T.P. Lucas, 1892)
Dipterygina babooni (Bethune-Baker, 1906)
Dipterygina kebeae (Bethune-Baker, 1906)
Eccleta xuthophanes Turner, 1902
Ecpatia dulcistriga (Walker, 1858)
Ecpatia melas (Bethune-Baker, 1906)
Epicyrtica bryistis (Turner, 1902)
Epicyrtica docima (Turner, 1920)
Epicyrtica hippolopha (Turner, 1936)
Epicyrtica lathridia Turner, 1908
Epicyrtica leucostigma (Turner, 1902)
Epicyrtica lichenophora (Lower, 1902)
Epicyrtica melanops (Lower, 1902)
Epicyrtica metallica (T.P. Lucas, 1898)
Epicyrtica oostigma (Turner, 1929)
Epicyrtica pamprepta (Turner, 1922)
Eremaula minor (Butler, 1886)
Eremochroa alphitias Meyrick, 1897
Eremochroa lunata (Lower, 1903)
Eremochroa macropa (Lower, 1897)
Eremochroa paradesma Lower, 1902
Eremochroa psammias Meyrick, 1897
Eremochroa thermidora Hampson, 1909
Eucatephia dinawa (Bethune-Baker, 1906)
Euryschema tricycla Turner, 1925
Hypoperigea tonsa (Guenée, 1852)
Lignispalta incertissima (Bethune-Baker, 1906)
Lophocalama neuritis Hampson, 1910
Lophocalama suffusa (T.P. Lucas, 1894)
Musothyma cyanastis Meyrick, 1897
Neumichtis adamantina (Turner, 1906)
Neumichtis archephanes Turner, 1920
Neumichtis callisina (Turner, 1902)
Neumichtis expulsa (Guenée, 1852)
Neumichtis iorrhoa (Meyrick, 1902)
Neumichtis mesophaea (Hampson, 1906)
Neumichtis nigerrima (Guenée, 1852)
Neumichtis prolifera (Walker, 1856)
Neumichtis saliaris (Guenée, 1852)
Neumichtis sepultrix (Guenée, 1852)
Neumichtis signata (Lower, 1905)
Neumichtis spumigera (Guenée, 1852)
Pachythrix hampsoni Nye, 1975
Pachythrix mniochlora (Meyrick, 1889)
Pansemna beryllodes (Turner, 1903)
Paromphale caeca (Swinhoe, 1902)
Platyprosopa nigrostrigata (Bethune-Baker, 1906)
Prometopus inassueta Guenée, 1852
Proteuxoa acontoura (Lower, 1915)
Proteuxoa adelopa (Hampson, 1909)
Proteuxoa adelphodes (Lower, 1902)
Proteuxoa amaurodes (Lower, 1902)
Proteuxoa angasi (R. Felder & Rogenhofer, 1874)
Proteuxoa argonephra (Turner, 1931)
Proteuxoa asbolaea (Turner, 1931)
Proteuxoa atmoscopa (Lower, 1902)
Proteuxoa atra (Guenée, 1852)
Proteuxoa atrisquamata (Lower, 1902)
Proteuxoa bistrigula (Walker, 1857)
Proteuxoa callimera (Lower, 1897)
Proteuxoa capularis (Guenée, 1852)
Proteuxoa chrysospila (Lower, 1902)
Proteuxoa cinereicollis (Guenée, 1852)
Proteuxoa coelenoptera (Lower, 1915)
Proteuxoa confinis (Walker, 1857)
Proteuxoa cornuta (Lower, 1902)
Proteuxoa cryphaea (Turner, 1908)
Proteuxoa crypsicharis (Lower, 1902)
Proteuxoa cyanoloma (Lower, 1902)
Proteuxoa desertorum (Turner, 1944)
Proteuxoa ebenodes (Turner, 1911)
Proteuxoa epiplecta (Guenée, 1868)
Proteuxoa euchroa (Lower, 1902)
Proteuxoa eupolia (Turner, 1936)
Proteuxoa flexirena (Walker, 1865)
Proteuxoa florescens (Walker, 1857)
Proteuxoa goniographa (Turner, 1943)
Proteuxoa gypsina (Lower, 1897)
Proteuxoa heliosema (Lower, 1902)
Proteuxoa heterogama (Hampson, 1909)
Proteuxoa hydraecioides (Guenée, 1852)
Proteuxoa hypochalchis (Turner, 1902)
Proteuxoa imparata (Walker, 1857)
Proteuxoa instipata (Walker, 1857)
Proteuxoa interferens (Walker, 1857)
Proteuxoa leptochroa (Turner, 1925)
Proteuxoa leucosticta (Turner, 1908)
Proteuxoa marginalis (Walker, 1865)
Proteuxoa melanographa (Turner, 1908)
Proteuxoa melodora (Lower, 1902)
Proteuxoa mesombra (Lower, 1893)
Proteuxoa metableta (Turner, 1939)
Proteuxoa metaneura (Lower, 1908)
Proteuxoa microdes (Lower, 1902)
Proteuxoa microspila (Lower, 1902)
Proteuxoa monochroa (Lower, 1902)
Proteuxoa nuna (Guenée, 1868)
Proteuxoa nyctereutica (Turner, 1942)
Proteuxoa nycteris (Turner, 1908)
Proteuxoa nyctimesa (Hampson, 1911)
Proteuxoa ochrias (Turner, 1911)
Proteuxoa oxygona (Lower, 1902)
Proteuxoa paragypsa (Lower, 1902)
Proteuxoa paratorna (Lower, 1902)
Proteuxoa passalota (Hampson, 1909)
Proteuxoa petrodora (Lower, 1902)
Proteuxoa pissonephra (Turner, 1939)
Proteuxoa plaesiospila (Turner, 1939)
Proteuxoa poliocrossa (Turner, 1903)
Proteuxoa porphyrescens (Lower, 1902)
Proteuxoa restituta (Guenée, 1852)
Proteuxoa rhodocentra (Lower, 1902)
Proteuxoa rubripuncta (Turner, 1933)
Proteuxoa rufimaculis (Turner, 1943)
Proteuxoa sanguinipuncta (Guenée, 1852)
Proteuxoa sarcomorpha (Lower, 1902)
Proteuxoa scotti (R. Felder & Rogenhofer, 1874)
Proteuxoa senta (Lower, 1902)
Proteuxoa spilocrossa (Turner, 1915)
Proteuxoa spodias Turner, 1908
Proteuxoa testaceicollis (Guenée, 1852)
Proteuxoa tibiata (Guenée, 1852)
Proteuxoa tortisigna (Walker, 1857)
Proteuxoa typhlopa (Lower, 1900)
Proteuxoa verecunda (Walker, 1858)
Pseudoedaleosia scoparioides Strand, 1924
Sasunaga apiciplaga Warren, 1912
Sasunaga leucorina (Hampson, 1908)
Sasunaga tenebrosa (Moore, 1867)
Spodoptera apertura (Walker, 1865)
Spodoptera exempta (Walker, 1857)
Spodoptera exigua (Hübner, 1808)
Spodoptera litura (Fabricius, 1775)
Spodoptera mauritia (Boisduval, 1833)
Spodoptera picta (Guérin-Méneville, 1831)
Spodoptera umbraculata (Walker, 1858)
Stenopterygia kebea (Bethune-Baker, 1906)
Syntheta xylitis Turner, 1902
Thalatha artificiosa Turner, 1936
Thalatha bryochlora (Meyrick, 1897)
Thalatha chionobola (Turner, 1941)
Thalatha guttalis (Walker, 1866)
Thalatha melaleuca Hampson, 1908
Thalatha melanophrica Turner, 1922
Thalatha symprepes (Turner, 1933)
Thalatha trichroma (Meyrick, 1902)
Thegalea haemorrhanta (Hampson, 1909)

The following species belongs to the subfamily Amphipyrinae, but have not been assigned to a genus yet. Given here is the original name given to the species when it was first described:
Orthosia columbaris T.P. Lucas, 1894
Orthosia cremnodes Lower, 1893
Euprora crypsichlora Turner, 1931
Perigea dinawa Bethune-Baker, 1906
Stauropus euryscia Lower, 1903
Nitocris limbosa Guenée, 1868
Chasmina lispodes Turner, 1936
Tringilburra lugens T.P. Lucas, 1901
Xanthoptera macrosema Lower, 1903
Euplexia polycmeta Turner, 1902

Agaristinae
Agarista agricola (Donovan, 1805)
Agaristodes feisthamelii (Herrich-Schäffer, 1853)
Apina callisto (Angas, 1847)
Argyrolepidia aequalis (Walker, 1864)
Argyrolepidia fractus (Rothschild, 1899)
Argyrolepidia thoracophora (Turner, 1920)
Burgena varia (Walker, 1854)
Coenotoca subaspersa (Walker, 1865)
Coenotoca unimacula (Lower, 1903)
Comocrus behri (Angas, 1847)
Cremnophora angasii (Angas, 1847)
Cruria donowani (Boisduval, 1832)
Cruria epicharita Turner, 1911
Cruria kochii (W.J. Macleay, 1866)
Cruria latifascia Jordan, 1912
Cruria synopla Turner, 1903
Cruria tropica (T.P. Lucas, 1891)
Eutrichopidia latinus (Donovan, 1805)
Hecatesia exultans Walker, 1865
Hecatesia fenestrata Boisduval, 1828
Hecatesia thyridion Feisthamel, 1839
Idalima aethrias (Turner, 1908)
Idalima affinis (Boisduval, 1832)
Idalima leonora (Doubleday, 1846)
Idalima metasticta Hampson, 1910
Idalima tasso (Jordan, 1912)
Ipanica cornigera (Butler, 1886)
Leucogonia cosmopis (Lower, 1897)
Leucogonia ekeikei (Bethune-Baker, 1906)
Mimeusemia centralis (Rothschild, 1896)
Mimeusemia econia Hampson, 1900
Mimeusemia simplex (T.P. Lucas, 1891)
Periopta ardescens (Butler, 1884)
Periopta diversa (Walker, 1865)
Periscepta butleri (Swinhoe, 1892)
Periscepta polysticta (Butler, 1875)
Phalaenoides glycinae Lewin, 1805
Phalaenoides tristifica (Hübner, 1818)
Platagarista macleayi (W.J. Macleay, 1864)
Radinocera maculosus (Rothschild, 1896)
Radinocera vagata (Walker, 1865)
Zalissa catocalina Walker, 1865
Zalissa pratti (Bethune-Baker, 1906)
Zalissa stichograpta Turner, 1943

Catocalinae
Abriesa derna Swinhoe, 1900
Acantholipes juba (Swinhoe, 1902)
Acantholipes trajecta (Walker, 1865)
Acantholipes zuboides (Montague, 1914)
Acanthoprora melanoleuca Hampson, 1926
Achaea argilla Swinhoe, 1901
Achaea eusciasta Hampson, 1913
Achaea janata (Linnaeus, 1758)
Achaea mercatoria (Fabricius, 1775)
Achaea serva (Fabricius, 1775)
Agamana callixeris (Lower, 1903)
Agamana cavatalis Walker, 1866
Agamana conjungens (Walker, 1858)
Agamana pergrata (Turner, 1933)
Agamana sarmentosa (R. Felder & Rogenhofer, 1874)
Alapadna pauropis Turner, 1902
Alophosoma emmelopis (Turner, 1929)
Alophosoma hypoxantha (Lower, 1902)
Alophosoma syngenes Turner, 1929
Amphiongia chordophoides (T.P. Lucas, 1892)
Anisoneura aluco (Fabricius, 1775)
Anomis albitibia (Walker, 1858)
Anomis combinans (Walker, 1858)
Anomis definata T.P. Lucas, 1894
Anomis figlina Butler, 1889
Anomis flava (Fabricius, 1775)
Anomis involuta (Walker, 1858)
Anomis lyona (Swinhoe, 1919)
Anomis nigritarsis (Walker, 1858)
Anomis planalis (Swinhoe, 1902)
Anomis psamathodes (Turner, 1902)
Anomis schistosema Hampson, 1926
Anticarsia distorta Hampson, 1926
Anticarsia irrorata (Fabricius, 1781)
Arcte coerula (Guenée, 1852)
Aroana hemicyclophora (Turner, 1944)
Aroana ochreistriga (Bethune-Baker, 1906)
Aroana rubra Bethune-Baker, 1906
Arsacia rectalis (Walker, 1863)
Arthisma scissuralis Moore, 1883
Athyrma subpunctata (Bethune-Baker, 1906)
Attonda trifasciata (Moore, 1877)
Audea irioleuca (Meyrick, 1897)
Avatha discolor (Fabricius, 1794)
Avatha novoguineana (Bethune-Baker, 1906)
Avatha subumbra (Bethune-Baker, 1906)
Avirostrum pratti Bethune-Baker, 1908
Avitta discipuncta (R. Felder & Rogenhofer, 1874)
Avitta longicorpus A.E. Prout, 1922
Avitta ophiusalis (Walker, 1859)
Avitta quadrilinea (Walker, 1863)
Avitta rufifrons Moore, 1887
Avitta zopheropa (Turner, 1909)
Axiocteta oenoplex Turner, 1902
Axiocteta turneri Bethune-Baker, 1906
Bocula odontosema Turner, 1909
Bocula sejuncta (Walker, 1856)
Brachycyttara crypsipyrrha Turner, 1933
Brachyona xylodesma Hampson, 1926
Brana calopasa Walker, 1858
Brevipecten captata (Butler, 1889)
Calyptra minuticornis (Guenée, 1852)
Chalciope alcyona (H. Druce, 1888)
Chodda costiplaga (Bethune-Baker, 1906)
Chodda ochreovenata (Bethune-Baker, 1906)
Chrysopera combinans (Walker, 1858)
Conosema pratti (Bethune-Baker, 1908)
Crioa acronyctoides Walker, 1858
Crioa aroa (Bethune-Baker, 1908)
Crioa hades (Lower, 1903)
Crioa indistincta (Walker, 1865)
Crithote pannicula (Swinhoe, 1904)
Crypsiprora ophiodesma Meyrick, 1902
Crypsiprora orthogramma (Turner, 1936)
Crypsiprora peratoscia (Hampson, 1926)
Cultripalpa partita Guenée, 1852
Cyclodes spectans Snellen, 1886
Dahlia capnobela Turner, 1902
Daona constellans (T.P. Lucas, 1898)
Daona detersalis (Walker, 1866)
Dasypodia cymatodes Guenée, 1852
Dasypodia selenophora Guenée, 1852
Delgamma pangonia (Guenée, 1852)
Diatenes aglossoides Guenée, 1852
Diatenes chalybescens Guenée, 1852
Diatenes gerula Guenée, 1852
Diatenes igneipicta (Lower, 1902)
Dinumma mediobrunnea Bethune-Baker, 1906
Diplothecta loxomita (Turner, 1908)
Donuca castalia (Fabricius, 1775)
Donuca lanipes (Butler, 1877)
Donuca orbigera (Guenée, 1852)
Donuca rubropicta (Butler, 1874)
Donuca spectabilis Walker, 1865
Donuca xanthopyga (Turner, 1909)
Dordura aliena (Walker, 1865)
Dysgonia absentimacula (Guenée, 1852)
Dysgonia arctotaenia (Guenée, 1852)
Dysgonia constricta (Butler, 1874)
Dysgonia copidiphora (Hampson, 1913)
Dysgonia curvisecta (L.B. Prout, 1919)
Dysgonia dicoela (Turner, 1909)
Dysgonia frontinus (Donovan, 1805)
Dysgonia hamatilis (Guenée, 1852)
Dysgonia hercodes (Meyrick, 1902)
Dysgonia hicanora (Turner, 1903)
Dysgonia infractafinis (T.P. Lucas, 1895)
Dysgonia latizona (Butler, 1874)
Dysgonia monogona (Lower, 1903)
Dysgonia palumba (Guenée, 1852)
Dysgonia propyrrha (Walker, 1858)
Dysgonia senex (Walker, 1858)
Dysgonia serratilinea (Bethune-Baker, 1906)
Dysgonia simillima (Guenée, 1852)
Dysgonia solomonensis (Hampson, 1913)
Ecphysis robiginosa (Turner, 1943)
Egone atrisquamata Hampson, 1926
Egone bipunctalis Walker, 1863
Entomogramma torsa Guenée, 1852
Episparis angulatilinea Bethune-Baker, 1906
Eporectis phenax Meyrick, 1902
Eporectis tephropis (Turner, 1902)
Ercheia dubia (Butler, 1874)
Ercheia ekeikei Bethune-Baker, 1906
Ercheia kebea Bethune-Baker, 1906
Erebus crepuscularis (Linnaeus, 1758)
Erebus macfarlanei (Butler, 1876)
Erebus nyctaculis (Snellen, 1880)
Erebus terminitincta (Gaede, 1938)
Ericeia goniosema Hampson, 1922
Ericeia inangulata (Guenée, 1852)
Ericeia pertendens (Walker, 1858)
Ericeia plaesiodes Turner, 1932
Ericeia sobria Walker, 1858
Ericeia subsignata (Walker, 1858)
Erygia apicalis Guenée, 1852
Eudesmeola lawsoni (R. Felder & Rogenhofer, 1874)
Eudocima aurantia (Moore, 1877
Eudocima cocalus (Cramer, 1777)
Eudocima fullonia (Clerck, 1764)
Eudocima iridescens (T.P. Lucas, 1894)
Eudocima jordani (Holland, 1900)
Eudocima materna (Linnaeus, 1767)
Eudocima salaminia (Cramer, 1777)
Eurythmus bryophiloides Butler, 1886
Facidina polystigma (Lower, 1903)
Facidina spilophracta (Turner, 1933)
Felinia precedens (Walker, 1858)
Fodina ostorius (Donovan, 1805)
Gesonia obeditalis Walker, 1859
Grammodes cooma Swinhoe, 1900
Grammodes diagarmma (Lower, 1903)
Grammodes geometrica (Fabricius, 1775)
Grammodes justa Walker, 1858
Grammodes occulta Berio, 1956
Grammodes ocellata Tepper, 1890
Grammodes oculata Snellen, 1880
Grammodes oculicola Walker, 1858
Grammodes pulcherrima T.P. Lucas, 1892
Grammodes quaesita Swinhoe, 1901
Grammodes stolida (Fabricius, 1775)
Hamodes propitia (Guérin-Méneville, 1831)
Heterormista modesta Swinhoe, 1901
Heterormista psammochroa (Lower, 1903)
Homodes bracteigutta (Walker, 1862)
Homodes crocea Guenée, 1852
Homodes iomolybda Meyrick, 1889
Hopetounia albida Hampson, 1926
Hopetounia carda Swinhoe, 1902
Hopetounia pudica (Lower, 1903)
Hulodes caranea (Cramer, 1780)
Hulodes drylla Guenée, 1852
Hyperlopha amicta Turner, 1903
Hyperlopha aridela Turner, 1902
Hyperlopha cristifera (Walker, 1865)
Hypocala affinis Rothschild, 1915
Hypocala deflorata (Fabricius, 1792)
Hypocala guttiventris Walker, 1858
Hypocala toana Swinhoe, 1915
Hypocala violacea Butler, 1879
Hypoprora tyra (Swinhoe, 1902)
Hyposemansis asbolaea (Lower, 1903)
Hypospila creberrima (Walker, 1858)
Hypospila dochmotoma (Turner, 1939)
Ischyja albata (R. Felder & Rogenhofer, 1874)
Ischyja ebusa Swinhoe, 1902
Ischyja manlia (Cramer, 1766)
Ischyja neocherina (Butler, 1877)
Lacera noctilio (Fabricius, 1794)
Lacera uniformis Holloway, 1979
Leptotroga costalis (Moore, 1883)
Lophoruza albisecta (Warren, 1913)
Lophoruza diversalis (Walker, 1866)
Lophozancla prolixa Turner, 1932
Loxioda hampsoni (Bethune-Baker, 1906)
Lyncestis melanoschista (Meyrick, 1897)
Lyncestis phaeocrossa Turner, 1932
Mecodina bisignata (Walker, 1865)
Mecodina praecipua (Walker, 1865)
Meranda gilviceps (Turner, 1908)
Meranda holochrysa Meyrick, 1902
Meranda susialis (Walker, 1859)
Mocis alterna (Walker, 1858)
Mocis frugalis (Fabricius, 1775)
Mocis trifasciata (Stephens, 1830)
Nagia compsotrephes (Turner, 1932)
Nagia linteola (Guenée, 1852)
Nagia sthenistica Hampson, 1926
Neogabara plagiola Wileman & West, 1929
Niguza anisogramma Lower, 1905
Niguza eucesta (Turner, 1903)
Niguza habroscopa Lower, 1915
Niguza oculita Swinhoe, 1901
Niguza spiramioides Walker, 1858
Olyssa calamitosa Walker, 1858
Ophisma gravata Guenée, 1852
Ophiusa coronata (Fabricius, 1775)
Ophiusa costiplaga (Hulstaert, 1924)
Ophiusa discriminans (Walker, 1858)
Ophiusa disjungens (Walker, 1858)
Ophiusa hituense (Pagenstecher, 1884)
Ophiusa novenaria (T.P. Lucas, 1898)
Ophiusa parcemacula (T.P. Lucas, 1891)
Ophiusa tirhaca (Cramer, 1777)
Ophiusa trapezium (Guenée, 1852)
Ophyx eurrhoa (Lower, 1903)
Ophyx ochroptera Guenée, 1852
Ophyx pseudoptera (Lower, 1903)
Oraesia argyrosigna Moore, 1884
Oraesia emarginata (Fabricius, 1794)
Orthozancla rhythmotypa Turner, 1933
Oxygonitis sericeata Hampson, 1893
Oxyodes scrobiculata (Fabricius, 1775)
Oxyodes tricolor Guenée, 1852
Pandesma partita (Walker, 1858)
Pandesma quenavadi Guenée, 1852
Pandesma submurina (Walker, 1865)
Pangrapta adoxopis (Turner, 1908)
Pangrapta aroa Bethune-Baker, 1906
Pantydia canescens Walker, 1869
Pantydia capistrata T.P. Lucas, 1894
Pantydia diemeni Guenée, 1852
Pantydia metaphaea (Hampson, 1912)
Pantydia metaspila (Walker, 1858)
Pantydia sparsa Guenée, 1852
Parapadna placospila (Turner, 1908)
Parapadna zonophora (Turner, 1908)
Pericyma cruegeri (Butler, 1886)
Phyllodes imperialis H. Druce, 1888
Phytometra formosalis (Walker, 1866)
Phytometra laevis (Swinhoe, 1901)
Platyja cyanopasta (Turner, 1908)
Platyja exequialis (T.P. Lucas, 1901)
Platyja umminia (Cramer, 1780)
Plecoptera quaesita (Swinhoe, 1885)
Plusiodonta arctipennis Butler, 1886
Plusiodonta coelonota (Kollar, 1844)
Polydesma boarmoides Guenée, 1852
Polydesmiola meekii (T.P. Lucas, 1894)
Praxis aterrima (Walker, 1856)
Praxis difficilis (Walker, 1858)
Praxis dirigens Walker, 1858
Praxis edwardsii Guenée, 1852
Praxis limbatis (Strand, 1924)
Praxis marmarinopa Meyrick, 1897
Praxis pandesma (Lower, 1902)
Praxis porphyretica Guenée, 1852
Prorocopis eulopha (Lower, 1903)
Prorocopis euxantha Lower, 1902
Prorocopis leucocrossa Lower, 1903
Prorocopis melanochorda Meyrick, 1897
Prorocopis transversilinea (Turner, 1941)
Pseudogyrtona fulvana Bethune-Baker, 1908
Pseudogyrtona perversa (Walker, 1862)
Pterocyclophora huntei Warren, 1903
Radara subcupralis (Walker, 1866)
Ramadasa crystallina (Lower, 1899)
Raparna crocophara Turner, 1922
Rhapsa eretmophora Turner, 1932
Rhapsa occidentalis Turner, 1944
Rhapsa suscitatalis (Walker, 1859)
Rhesala imparata Walker, 1858
Rhesalides curvata (T.P. Lucas, 1895)
Saroba maculicosta (Walker, 1858)
Saroba niphomacula (Lower, 1903)
Saroba rufescens (Pagenstecher, 1884)
Saroba trimaculata (Warren, 1903)
Savara variabilis (Pagenstecher, 1888)
Schistorhynx unistriga Roepke, 1938
Serrodes campana Guenée, 1852
Serrodes mediopallens A.E. Prout, 1924
Speiredonia darwiniana Zilli, 2010
Speiredonia mutabilis (Fabricius, 1794)
Speiredonia spectans (Guenée, 1852)
Speiredonia zamis (Stoll, 1790)
Spirama recessa (Walker, 1858)
Stenocarsia metaplatys Hampson, 1926
Stenoprora adelopis (Lower, 1903)
Stenoprora apicinota (Turner, 1944)
Stenoprora lophota (Lower, 1903)
Stenoprora perspicua (Turner, 1941)
Stenoprora triplax Turner, 1944
Sympis parkeri T.P. Lucas, 1894
Sympis rufibasis Guenée, 1852
Sypna buruensis A.E. Prout, 1926
Tamba conscripta (T.P. Lucas, 1892)
Tamba cyrtogramma (Turner, 1908)
Tamba elachista Hampson, 1926
Tamba haemacta (Turner, 1908)
Tamba meeki (Bethune-Baker, 1906)
Tamba syndesma (Lower, 1903)
Tamba tephraea (Turner, 1909)
Tathorhynchus fallax Swinhoe, 1902
Throana blechrodes (Turner, 1903)
Thyas miniacea (R. Felder & Rogenhofer, 1874)
Tolpiodes aphanta (Turner, 1902)
Tolpiodes melanoproctis Hampson, 1926
Tolpiodes oligolasia Hampson, 1926
Trigonodes cephise (Cramer, 1779)
Trigonodes hyppasia (Cramer, 1779)
Tropidtamba lepraota (Hampson, 1898)
Ulotrichopus dinawa (Bethune-Baker, 1906)
Veia caeruleotincta (Rothschild, 1915)
Veia contracta (Walker, 1865)
Veia microsticta (Turner, 1908)
Xanthanomis fuscifrons (Walker, 1864)
Xenogenes chrysoplaca Meyrick, 1910
Xenogenes gloriosa (T.P. Lucas, 1891)

The following species belongs to the subfamily Catocalinae, but have not been assigned to a genus yet. Given here is the original name given to the species when it was first described:
Prorocopis acroleuca Turner, 1929
Eustrotia acroleuca Turner, 1945
Crioa acronyctina Butler, 1886
Catada acrospila Turner, 1906
Sophta aeluropis Meyrick, 1902
Zethes alfura R. Felder & Rogenhofer, 1874
Glottula atronitens Walker, 1856
Madope auferens T.P. Lucas, 1898
Zethes ekeikei Bethune-Baker, 1906
Stenoprora eurycycla Turner, 1936
Crioa lophosoma Turner, 1906
Raparna lugubris Turner, 1922
Oruza maerens Turner, 1936
Noctua microrrhoea Fabricius, 1775
Crioa niphobleta Turner, 1929
Crioa nycterina Turner, 1902
Crysiprora oxymetopa Turner, 1941
Plecoptera plinthochroa Hampson, 1926
Oglasa prionosticha Turner, 1944
Amyna spilonota Lower, 1903
Prorocopis stenota Lower, 1903
Hypoprora tortuosa Turner, 1929
Raparna trigramma Turner, 1906

Chloephorinae
Acachmena xylonota (Lower, 1903)
Aiteta iridias (Meyrick, 1889)
Ariola coelisigna Walker, 1858
Armactica columbina Walker, 1865
Armactica conchidia (Butler, 1886)
Armactica endoleuca Hampson, 1912
Austrocarea iocephala (Turner, 1902)
Beara falcata Holloway, 1982
Cacyparis brevipennis Warren, 1916
Cacyparis melanolitha Turner, 1909
Carea unipunctata Bethune-Baker, 1906
Careades huntei (Warren, 1903)
Careades plana Warren, 1916
Clytophylla artia Turner, 1929
Earias chlorodes Meyrick, 1902
Earias flavida C. Felder, 1861
Earias huegeliana Gaede, 1937
Earias luteolaria Hampson, 1891
Earias paralella T.P. Lucas, 1898
Earias smaragdina Butler, 1886
Earias subviridis T.P. Lucas, 1898
Earias vittella (Fabricius, 1794)
Eligma orthoxantha Lower, 1903
Gabala australiata Warren, 1916
Lasiolopha saturata (Walker, 1865)
Maceda mansueta Walker, 1858
Maceda rotundimacula Warren, 1912
Maurilia iconica (Walker, 1857)
Negeta signata (Walker, 1863)
Orthocraspis leptoplasta Turner, 1920
Paracrama latimargo Warren, 1916
Pterogonia cardinalis Holloway, 1976
Vizaga mirabilis (Bethune-Baker, 1906)
Westermannia argentata Butler, 1886
Westermannia concha Butler, 1886
Westermannia gloriosa (Hampson, 1912)
Xanthodes albago (Fabricius, 1794)
Xanthodes amata Walker, 1865
Xanthodes congenita (Hampson, 1912)
Xanthodes emboloscia (Turner, 1902)
Xanthodes transversa Guenée, 1852

The following species belongs to the subfamily Chloephorinae, but have not been assigned to a genus yet. Given here is the original name given to the species when it was first described:
Blenina samphirophora Turner, 1920

Cuculliinae
Neogalea sunia (Guenée, 1852)

Euteliinae
Anigraea cinctipalpis (Walker, 1865)
Anigraea ochrobasis Hampson, 1912
Anigraea particolor Warren, 1914
Aplotelia tripartita (Semper, 1900)
Atacira olivaceiplaga (Bethune-Baker, 1906)
Chlumetia euthysticha (Turner, 1941)
Chlumetia transversa (Walker, 1863)
Paectes costistrigata (Bethune-Baker, 1906)
Paectes cyanodes (Turner, 1902)
Pataeta carbo (Guenée, 1852)
Penicillaria dorsipuncta (Hampson, 1912)
Penicillaria jocosatrix Guenée, 1952
Targalla delatrix (Guenée, 1852)
Targalla palliatrix (Guenée, 1852)
Targalla plumbea (Walker, 1865)
Targalla scelerata (Holland, 1900)
Targalla subocellata (Walker, 1863)
Targalla suffundens (Walker, 1863)

The following species belongs to the subfamily Euteliinae, but have not been assigned to a genus yet. Given here is the original name given to the species when it was first described:
Eutelia diapera Hampson, 1902

Hadeninae
Brithys crini (Fabricius, 1775)
Cirphis ebriosa (Guenée, 1852)
Dasygaster atrata Turner, 1931
Dasygaster padockina Guillou, 1841)
Elusa ceneusalis Walker, 1859
Elusa oenolopha Turner, 1902
Elusa pyrrhobaphes (Turner, 1943)
Elusa semipecten Swinhoe, 1901
Eurypsyche lewinii (Butler, 1886)
Leucania loreyi (Duponchel, 1827)
Leucania stenographa Lower, 1900
Leucania cruegeri Butler, 1886
Leucania linearis T.P. lucas, 1892
Leucania obumbrata T.P. Lucas, 1894
Leucania polysticha Turner, 1902
Leucania venalba Moore, 1867
Leucania yu Guenée, 1852
Leucania abdominalis (Walker, 1856)
Leucania dasycnema (Turner, 1912)
Leucania designata Walker, 1856
Leucania diatrecta Butler, 1886
Leucania leucosta Lower, 1902
Leucania porphyrodes (Turner, 1911)
Leucania rhodopsara (Turner, 1911)
Leucania uda Guenée, 1852
Leucania vibicosa (Turner, 1920)
Metopiora sanguinata (T.P. Lucas, 1892)
Mythimna acontosema (Turner, 1903)
Mythimna reversa (Moore, 1884)
Mythimna convecta (Walker, 1857)
Mythimna separata (Walker, 1865)
Mythimna consanguis (Guenée, 1852)
Mythimna cryptargyrea (Bethune-Baker, 1905)
Mythimna decisissima (Walker, 1865)
Mythimna formosana (Butler, 1880)
Mythimna leucosphenia (Bethune-Baker, 1905)
Mythimna nigrilinea (Leech, 1889)
Mythimna semicana (Pagenstecher, 1900)
Persectania dyscrita Common, 1954
Persectania ewingii (Westwood, 1839)
Tiracola plagiata (Walker, 1857)

Heliothinae
Adisura litarga (Turner, 1920)
Adisura marginalis (Walker, 1858)
Australothis exopisso Matthews, 1999
Australothis rubrescens (Walker, 1858)
Australothis tertia (Roepke, 1941)
Helicoverpa armigera (Hübner, 1808)
Helicoverpa assulta (Guenée, 1852)
Helicoverpa hardwicki Matthews, 1999
Helicoverpa prepodes (Common, 1985)
Helicoverpa punctigera (Wallengren, 1860)
Heliocheilus abaccheutus Matthews, 1999
Heliocheilus aberrans (Butler, 1886)
Heliocheilus albivenata (Montague, 1914)
Heliocheilus aleurota (Lower, 1902)
Heliocheilus atrilinea (Turner, 1943)
Heliocheilus canusina (Swinhoe, 1901)
Heliocheilus cistella (Swinhoe, 1901)
Heliocheilus cladotus Swinhoe, 1901
Heliocheilus cramboides (Guenée, 1852)
Heliocheilus eodora (Meyrick, 1902)
Heliocheilus ferruginosa (Turner, 1911)
Heliocheilus flavitincta (Lower, 1908)
Heliocheilus fumata (T.P. Lucas, 1890)
Heliocheilus halimolimnus Matthews, 1999
Heliocheilus ionola (Swinhoe, 1901)
Heliocheilus melibaphes (Hampson, 1903)
Heliocheilus mesoleuca (Lower, 1902)
Heliocheilus moribunda (Guenée, 1852)
Heliocheilus neurota (Lower, 1903)
Heliocheilus pallida (Butler, 1886)
Heliocheilus puncticulata (Warren, 1913)
Heliocheilus ranalaetensis Matthews, 1999
Heliocheilus rhodopolia (Turner, 1911)
Heliocheilus thelycritus Matthews, 1999
Heliocheilus vulpinotatus Matthews, 1999
Heliothis hoarei Matthews, 1999
Heliothis punctifera Walker, 1857
Heliothis roseivena (Walker, 1866)

Hypeninae
Aethalina asaphes Turner, 1902
Arrade cristatum (Hampson, 1893)
Arrade destituta (Walker, 1865)
Arrade erebusalis Walker, 1863
Arrade leucocosmalis (Walker, 1863)
Arrade percnopis Turner, 1908
Artigisa byrsopa (Lower, 1903)
Artigisa dentilinea (Turner, 1909)
Artigisa impropria (Walker, 1865)
Artigisa lignicolaria (Walker, 1866)
Artigisa melanephele Hampson, 1914
Britha biguttata Walker, 1866
Calathusa aethalistis Lower, 1915
Calathusa allopis (Meyrick, 1902)
Calathusa anisocentra Turner, 1944
Calathusa basicunea Walker, 1858
Calathusa charactis (Meyrick, 1902)
Calathusa cyrtosticha Turner, 1929
Calathusa dispila (Turner, 1902)
Calathusa eremna (Turner, 1902)
Calathusa glaucopasta Turner, 1941
Calathusa hemicapna Turner, 1939
Calathusa hemiscia Lower, 1915
Calathusa hypotherma (Lower, 1903)
Calathusa ischnodes (Turner, 1903)
Calathusa maritima Turner, 1941
Calathusa mesospila (Turner, 1902)
Calathusa metableta (Turner, 1902)
Calathusa octogesima (Turner, 1902)
Calathusa phaeoneura Turner, 1939
Calathusa polyplecta Turner, 1929
Calathusa stenophylla (Turner, 1902)
Calathusa taphreuta (Meyrick, 1902)
Calathusa thermosticha Lower, 1915
Catada charalis Swinhoe, 1900
Catadoides punctata Bethune-Baker, 1908
Dichromia quinqualis Walker, 1859
Elaphristis anthracia Meyrick, 1891
Elaphristis anthracitis (Turner, 1902)
Elaphristis leucochorda (Turner, 1902)
Elaphristis melanica (Turner, 1902)
Elaphristis psoloessa (Turner, 1909)
Epitripta acosmopis Turner, 1902
Esthlodora cyanospila Turner, 1908
Esthlodora variabilis (Swinhoe, 1901)
Esthlodora versicolor Turner, 1902
Euphiuche apoblepta (Turner, 1908)
Foveades aroensis Bethune-Baker, 1908
Goniocraspedon mistura (Swinhoe, 1891)
Goniophylla fragilis Turner, 1945
Harita brachyphylla (Turner, 1903)
Harita nebulosa (Moore, 1881)
Harita nodyna (Bethune-Baker, 1908)
Hypena conscitalis Walker, 1866
Hypena euryzostra Turner, 1932
Hypena gonospilalis Walker, 1866
Hypena gypsospila Turner, 1903
Hypena hoareae Holloway, 1977
Hypena incognata Bethune-Baker, 1908
Hypena isogona Meyrick, 1889
Hypena labatalis Walker, 1859
Hypena laceratalis Walker, 1859
Hypena mandatalis Walker, 1859
Hypena masurialis Guenée, 1854
Hypena orthographa Turner, 1932
Hypena pelodes Turner, 1932
Hypena simplex T.P. Lucas, 1895
Hypena subvittalis Walker, 1866
Hypena sylpha Butler, 1887
Hypenagonia mesoscia (Turner, 1933)
Hypenarana acrocausta (Turner, 1944)
Hypertrocta brunnea (Bethune-Baker, 1908)
Lophotoma diagrapha Turner, 1902
Lophotoma metabula Turner, 1902
Lysimelia lenis (T.P. Lucas, 1898)
Mecistoptera albisigna Hampson, 1912
Mecistoptera lithochroa Lower, 1903
Metaphoenia rhodias (Turner, 1908)
Meyrickella ruptellus (Walker, 1863)
Meyrickella torquesauria (T.P. Lucas, 1892)
Naarda calliceros Turner, 1932
Naarda xanthonephra Turner, 1908
Olulis subrosea Turner, 1908
Panilla aroa Bethune-Baker, 1906
Panilla spilotis (Meyrick, 1902)
Paonidia anthracias (Lower, 1897)
Parilyrgis concolor Bethune-Baker, 1908
Parilyrgis nyctichroa (Turner, 1908)
Paurophylla aleuropasta Turner, 1902
Pherechoa crypsichlora Turner, 1932
Philogethes metableta Turner, 1939
Prionopterina grammatistis (Meyrick, 1897)
Prionopterina modesta Turner, 1936
Prionopterina tritosticha (Turner, 1902)
Prolophota pallida (Turner, 1936)
Rhodina falculalis Guenée, 1854
Rhodina hyporrhoda (Turner, 1902)
Rhynchina inornata (Butler, 1886)
Rhynchodontodes chalcias (T.P. Lucas, 1895)
Sandava scitisignata (Walker, 1862)
Sandava xylistis Swinhoe, 1900
Sarobela litterata (Pagenstecher, 1888)
Stenopaltis lithina Swinhoe, 1901
Synolulis rhodinastis (Meyrick, 1902)
Tigrana detritalis Walker, 1866
Tigrana fervidalis Walker, 1866

Hypenodinae
Luceria oculalis (Moore, 1877)
Schrankia capnophanes (Turner, 1939)
Schrankia costaestrigalis (Stephens, 1834)
Trigonistis demonias Meyrick, 1902

Noctuinae
Agrotis emboloma (Lower, 1918)
Agrotis infusa (Boisduval, 1832)
Agrotis interjectionis Guenée, 1852
Agrotis ipsilon (Hufnagel, 1766)
Agrotis munda Walker, 1857
Agrotis poliophaea Turner, 1926
Agrotis poliotis (Hampson, 1903)
Agrotis porphyricollis Guenée, 1852
Agrotis radians Guenée, 1852
Buciara bipartita Walker, 1869
Diarsia intermixta (Guenée, 1852)
Ectopatria aspera (Walker, 1857)
Ectopatria clavigera (Turner, 1943)
Ectopatria contrasta Strand, 1924
Ectopatria deloptis (Lower, 1908)
Ectopatria euglypta (Lower, 1908)
Ectopatria horologa (Meyrick, 1897)
Ectopatria loxonephra (Turner, 1944)
Ectopatria mniodes (Lower, 1902)
Ectopatria mundoides (Lower, 1893)
Ectopatria neuroides (Swinhoe, 1901)
Ectopatria ochroleuca (Lower, 1902)
Ectopatria paurogramma (Lower, 1902)
Ectopatria pelosticta (Lower, 1902)
Ectopatria plinthina (Hampson, 1909)
Ectopatria spilonata (Lower, 1902)
Ectopatria subrufescens (Walker, 1865)
Ectopatria umbrosa Hampson, 1903
Ectopatria virginea Lower, 1905
Ectopatria xerampelina (Turner, 1904)

Nolinae
Acatapaustus atrinota (Hampson, 1911)
Acatapaustus leucospila (Turner, 1899)
Acatapaustus mesoleuca (Lower, 1903)
Acatapaustus metallopa (Meyrick, 1886)
Aquita plagiochyta (Turner, 1944)
Aquita tactalis (Walker, 1863)
Barasa cymatistis (Meyrick, 1889)
Elesma subglauca Walker, 1865
Meganola major (Hampson, 1891)
Nola achromia Hampson, 1909
Nola aenictis (Meyrick, 1888)
Nola albalis (Walker, 1866)
Nola amorpha (Turner, 1944)
Nola anisogona (Lower, 1893)
Nola argentea (T.P. Lucas, 1890)
Nola atmophanes (Turner, 1944)
Nola aulacota (Meyrick, 1886)
Nola bathycyrta (Turner, 1944)
Nola belotypa Hampson, 1914
Nola bifascialis (Walker, 1865)
Nola biguttalis Walker, 1866
Nola celaenephes (Turner, 1944)
Nola ceramota (Turner, 1944)
Nola cerraunias (Turner, 1899)
Nola coelobathra (Turner, 1944)
Nola coelophora (Turner, 1944)
Nola crucigera (Turner, 1944)
Nola cycota (Meyrick, 1886)
Nola cymatias (Turner, 1944)
Nola delograpta (Turner, 1944)
Nola desmotes (Turner, 1899)
Nola diastropha (Turner, 1944)
Nola elaphra (Turner, 1944)
Nola elaphropasta (Turner, 1944)
Nola epicentra (Meyrick, 1886)
Nola eucolpa (Turner, 1944)
Nola eucompsa (Turner, 1944)
Nola euraphes (Turner, 1944)
Nola eurrhyncha (Turner, 1944)
Nola eurylopha Turner, 1944
Nola fasciata (Walker, 1866)
Nola fovifera (Hampson, 1903)
Nola goniophora Turner, 1944
Nola hesycha (Meyrick, 1888)
Nola irenica (Meyrick, 1886)
Nola lechriopa Hampson, 1914
Nola lechriotropa (Turner, 1944)
Nola leucolopha (Turner, 1944)
Nola leucoma (Meyrick, 1886)
Nola maculifera (Turner, 1944)
Nola melanogramma Hampson, 1900
Nola microphila (Turner, 1899)
Nola monozona (Lower, 1897)
Nola niphostena (Lower, 1896)
Nola ochrosticha Turner, 1944
Nola parallacta (Meyrick, 1886)
Nola paromoea (Meyrick, 1886)
Nola paroxynta (Meyrick, 1886)
Nola phaeogramma (Turner, 1944)
Nola phloeophila Hampson, 1914
Nola plagioschema Turner, 1939
Nola platygona (Lower, 1897)
Nola pleurochorda (Turner, 1944)
Nola pleurosema (Turner, 1944)
Nola poliophasma (Turner, 1933)
Nola porrigens (Walker, 1858)
Nola pothina Turner, 1944
Nola pycnographa (Turner, 1944)
Nola pycnopasta (Turner, 1944)
Nola pygmaeodes (Turner, 1944)
Nola scabralis (Walker, 1866)
Nola semograpta (Meyrick, 1886)
Nola sphaerospila (Turner, 1944)
Nola subpallida (Turner, 1944)
Nola taeniata Snellen, 1875
Nola tetralopha (Turner, 1944)
Nola tholera (Turner, 1926)
Nola tornotis (Meyrick, 1888)
Nola vepallida Turner, 1944
Nola vernalis Lower, 1900
Nola zaplethes Hampson, 1914
Pisara hyalospila Hampson, 1914
Uraba deplanana Walker, 1866
Uraba lugens Walker, 1863

Plusiinae
Anadevidia peponis (Fabricius, 1775)
Argyrogramma signata (Fabricius, 1775)
Chrysodeixis acuta (Walker, 1858)
Chrysodeixis argentifera (Guenée, 1852)
Chrysodeixis eriosoma (Doubleday, 1843)
Chrysodeixis illuminata (G.S. Robinson, 1968)
Chrysodeixis subsidens (Walker, 1858)
Ctenoplusia albostriata (Bremer & Grey, 1853)
Ctenoplusia chillagoes (T.P. Lucas, 1900)
Ctenoplusia furcifera (Walker, 1858)
Dactyloplusia impulsa (Walker, 1865)
Notioplusia illustrata (Guenée, 1852)
Scriptoplusia rubiflabellata (A.E. Prout, 1921)
Thysanoplusia orichalcea (Fabricius, 1775)
Trichoplusia lectula (Walker, 1858)
Zonoplusia ochreata (Walker, 1865)

Rivulinae
Rivula aenictopis Turner, 1908
Rivula biagi Bethune-Baker, 1908
Rivula concinna (T.P. Lucas, 1895)
Rivula curvifera (Walker, 1862)
Rivula everta Swinhoe, 1901
Rivula niphodesma Meyrick, 1891
Rivula obtusalis Walker, 1866 (status unknown, probably invalid)

Sarrothripinae
Blenina donans Walker, 1858
Blenina lichenopa (Meyrick, 1897)
Blenina viridata Bethune-Baker, 1906
Characoma curiosa (Swinhoe, 1890)
Characoma nilotica (Rogenhofer, 1882)
Characoma vallata (Meyrick, 1902)
Dilophothripa lobata Hampson, 1907
Etanna basalis Walker, 1862
Garella rotundipennis Walker, 1863
Giaura punctata (T.P. Lucas, 1890)
Gyrtothripa pusilla (Moore, 1888)
Hypolispa leucopolia Turner, 1926
Iscadia inexacta (Walker, 1858)
Iscadia poliochroa (Hampson, 1912)
Iscadia pulchra (Butler, 1886)
Labanda huntei Warren, 1903
Lophothripa vitea (Swinhoe, 1885)
Microthripa baeota (Turner, 1902)
Mniothripa bradleyi D.S. Fletcher, 1957
Nanaguna albisecta Hampson, 1905
Nanaguna breviuscula Walker, 1863
Nanaguna clopaea (Turner, 1902)
Nanaguna polypoecila Turner, 1929
Nanaguna praedulcis Turner, 1920
Nanaguna quadrifera Warren, 1914
Nanaguna variegata (Hampson, 1894)
Nycteola exophila (Meyrick, 1888)
Nycteola indica (R. Felder, 1874)
Nycteola minutum (Turner, 1902)
Nycteola polycyma (Turner, 1899)
Nycteola symmicta (Turner, 1902)
Ochrothripa leptochroma (Turner, 1902)
Ochthophora sericina Turner, 1902
Ochthophora turneri Bethune-Baker, 1906
Risoba grisea Bethune-Baker, 1906
Selepa celtis Moore, 1858
Selepa circulella (Walker, 1866)
Selepa discigera (Walker, 1864)
Selepa euryochra Turner, 1920
Selepa geraea (Hampson, 1905)
Selepa rhythmopis (Turner, 1902)
Thriponea melanograpta (Turner, 1920)
Thriponea nigrostrigata (Bethune-Baker, 1905)
Thriponea orbiculigera (Turner, 1936)
Timorodes blepharias Meyrick, 1902

Stictopterinae
Aegilia describens Walker, 1858
Aegilia indescribens (A.E. Prout, 1922)
Gyrtona polionota Hampson, 1905
Gyrtona semicarbonalis Walker, 1863
Lophoptera abbreviata Walker, 1865
Lophoptera hemithyris (Hampson, 1905)
Lophoptera melanesigera Holloway, 1985
Lophoptera nama (Swinhoe, 1900)
Lophoptera vittigera Walker, 1865
Savoca divitalis (Walker, 1863)
Savoca lophota (Turner, 1909)
Savoca xista (Swinhoe, 1893)
Stictoptera aequisecta Turner, 1933
Stictoptera cucullioides Guenée, 1852
Stictoptera macromma Snellen, 1880
Stictoptera pammeces Turner, 1920

Stirriinae
Austrazenia pura (Swinhoe, 1902)
Austrazenia tusa (Swinhoe, 1902)

Aganainae
Agape chloropyga (Walker, 1854)
Asota australis (Boisduval, 1832)
Asota caricae (Fabricius, 1775)
Asota heliconia (Linnaeus, 1758)
Asota iodamia (Herrich-Schäffer, 1854)
Asota orbona (Vollenhoven, 1863)
Asota plagiata (Walker, 1854)
Digama marmorea Butler, 1877
Neochera dominia (Cramer, 1780)

External links 
Aganaidae at Australian Faunal Directory
Noctuidae at Australian Faunal Directory

Australia
Noctuidae